is a former Japanese football player and manager.

Coaching career
Kamikawa was born in Kanagawa Prefecture on July 9, 1966. In 1994, he started coaching career at alma mater Meiji University. He coached until 2013. In 2016, he became a manager for J3 League club Grulla Morioka. Grulla finished at the 13th place of 16 clubs and he resigned end of 2016 season.

Managerial statistics

References

External links

1966 births
Living people
Meiji University alumni
Association football people from Kanagawa Prefecture
Japanese footballers
Japanese football managers
J3 League managers
Iwate Grulla Morioka managers
Association footballers not categorized by position